Wanstall is a surname. Notable people with the surname include:

Charles Wanstall (1912–1999), Australian politician and judge
Douglas Wanstall (1899–1974), British Anglican clergyman
Norman Wanstall (born 1935), British sound editor